Fox's Pizza Den is a pizzeria chain based in Murrysville, Pennsylvania, United States.

History 
It was founded in 1971 by Jim Fox in Pitcairn, Pennsylvania, and currently has more than 200 locations in 25 U.S. states, all franchise-owned.  

Fox's Pizza Den has been consistently ranked among the Top 25 pizza chains in the world. The Small Business Administration named Jim Fox as one of the country's top entrepreneurs during National Small Business Week, May 5–11, 2002.

References

External links
Official website
Official website in Nashville, TN

Pizza chains of the United States
Restaurants established in 1971
Companies based in Westmoreland County, Pennsylvania
Restaurant chains in the United States
American companies established in 1971
1971 establishments in Pennsylvania